Children of Mud is a 2017 Nigerian drama film written and directed by Imoh Umoren. The film stars Liz Benson and Matilda Obaseki in the lead roles while the film marked the fourth directorial venture of Imoh Umoren. The plot of the film is based on the concern about homeless children in Nigeria. The film had its theatrical release in Nigeria on 21 July 2017 and received positive reviews. The film won few nominations at award ceremonies.

Cast 

 Liz Benson
 Matilda Obaseki
 Raphael Jackson  as Miracle
 Mariam Kayode as Emem

Synopsis 
Being kicked out of their home by their own aunt, a young woman Emem and her blind brother Miracle go in search with a glimpse of hope in the mean streets.

Awards and nominations

References

External links 

 

2017 films
2017 drama films
English-language Nigerian films
Films shot in Nigeria
Nigerian drama films
2010s English-language films